Luciano Modica (4 January 1950 – 4 May 2021) was an Italian politician. He was a senator from 2002 to 2006.

References

1950 births
2021 deaths
Italian politicians
Senators of Legislature XIV of Italy
Democrats of the Left politicians
Democratic Party (Italy) politicians
Scuola Normale Superiore di Pisa alumni
Politicians from Catania